Ace Norton (born May 24, 1982, in Venice, Los Angeles, California) is a Japanese American filmmaker and artist born and raised in Venice, California. Norton creates visuals on a variety of media platforms including music videos, commercials, fashion films, and movies. Norton also is known for his drawings, sculptures, and frequently commissioned installation work.

Biography
Norton grew up in Venice, and is the son of writer/director Bill Norton Junior and grandson of motion picture screenwriter William Norton Senior.

Norton spent most of high school shooting short films. One of which, "Cherry Coke Rage",  won the highest award at the Los Angeles Film Festival. By the end of his high school career Norton had produced over 200 short films. Following graduation Norton attended the University of Southern California (USC) School of Cinema.

At USC Norton began to direct music videos for local Los Angeles bands. While in college Norton and friends (Toben Seymour, Hiro Murai, Charles Spano, Asiel Norton) created Commondeer Films. Using Norton's bedroom as office space, they would spend weekends emailing bands and animating low budget music videos. Commondeer produced over 40 music videos. After building his name in the Los Angeles art & music scenes, Norton's work caught the attention of Partizan founder Georges Bermann. In 2007, Norton signed to Partizan, then shortly thereafter to Prettybird (London) & Solab (France), & REPRESENT (Germany)...

Since then, Ace has directed over eighty music videos, television commercials, fashion shorts, and short films. His prolific body of work includes music videos for groups such as Foster The People, The Fray, Jennifer Lopez, Scissor Sisters, Aesop Rock, The Virgins, Sebastien Tellier, Death Cab for Cutie, Norah Jones, Steve Aoki, Regina Spektor, Bloc Party and Simian Mobile Disco,  And campaigns for Lexus, Gucci, Honda, Coca-Cola, La Mer, Old Spice, Adidas, Samsung, Smirnoff, Nissan, Gap, Mercedes, Dolby, Happy Socks, Paco Rabanne, T-Mobile, House of Fraser, and many many more.

Ace’s work has been featured in the L.A. Times, The Huffington Post, Nowness, Nylon, Interview, Anthem, Boards, Promo magazine and numerous others.  Highsnobiety regarded him as one of the "Best 10 Directors Working Today".  He won Best Film and Best Director at the Milan Fashion Film Festival as well of a slew of others at Berlin and La Jolla. He was nominated for “Director of the Year” at the MVPA for his video “Hustler,” by Simian Mobile Disco. This also won “Video of the Year” at the ViMus Music Video Awards and is listed as one of the “Top 100 Music Videos of All Time” by NME.  His work for Death Cab for Cutie was nominated for a Grammy. His films and videos have also been shown at the Los Angeles Film Festival, SXSW, and festivals in Berlin, Venice, Japan, and England. Ace has served as the president of the jury at the Off Film Festival in Venice, Italy and was a keynote speaker at both LAMVF and in Berlin.  

Ace loves to surf. He is a good friend of actor Emile Hirsch.

Videography

Music videos

 Felix Cartal – "Volcano" feat. John Whitney (2010)
 Sébastien Tellier – "La Ritournelle" (2005)
 The Willowz – "Ulcer Soul" (2005)
 Smoosh – "La Pump" (2005)
 The Faint – "Desperate Guys" (2005)
 Everybody Else – "Rich Girls, Poor Girls" (2003)
 A Gun Called Tension – "Gold Fronts" (2005)
 Death Cab for Cutie – "Someday You Will Be Loved" (2006)
 The Waking Hours – "Heartbeat" (2004)
 Executive Producer – Neon Blonde – "Headlines" (2005)
 Tahiti 80 – "Chinatown" (2005)
 Death Cab for Cutie – "Crooked Teeth" (2005)
 The Sounds – "Tony the Beat" (2006)
 Peter Walker – "What Do I Know" (2006)
 Smoosh – "Find a Way" (2006)
 Guster – "The New Underground" (2006)
 Teddybears feat. Madcobra- "Cobrastyle" (2006)
 Norah Jones – "Thinking About You" (2006)
 Patrick Wolf – "Hard Times" (2009)
 Norah Jones – "Sinkin' Soon" (2006)
 Mandy Moore – "Extraordinary" (2007)
 Mickey Avalon – "Jane Fonda" (2007)
 The Willowz – "Evil Son" (2007)
 Simian Mobile Disco – "Hustler" (2007)
 Aesop Rock – "Coffee" (2007)
 Bloc Party -"Flux" (2007)
 The Mountain Goats-"Sax Rohmer #1" (2007)
 LCD Soundsystem – "Big Ideas" (2007)
 Santogold – "Creator" (2007)
 Sébastien Tellier – "Divine" (2007)
 Does It Offend You, Yeah? – "Dawn of the Dead" (2007)
 She & Him (Zooey Deschanel & M. Ward) – "Why Do You Let Me Stay Here?" (2008)
 The Fray – "Never Say Never" (2008)
 The Virgins – "Teen Lovers" (2009)
 Darwin Deez – "Radar Detector" (2010)
 Scissor Sisters – "Any Which Way" (2010)
 Foster the People – "Helena Beat" (2011)
 Foster the People – "Call it What You Want" (2011)
 Regina Spektor – "Don't Leave Me (Ne Me Quitte Pas)" (2012)
 Best Coast – "The Only Place" (2012)
 Jennifer Lopez – "Goin' In" (2012)
 The Knocks – "Comfortable" (2014)
 phantoms- "voyeur" (2015)
 Vic Mensa- "16 Shots" (2018)

Short films
 Vacuum (2021)
 All Alone in April (2020)
 Happy Socks x THE RAMONES
 Please Touch the Art- Cantor Fine Art
 NINE LIVES with Elijah wood, Michael Angarano, Mike White, Christian Slater, Melodie Diaz, Niki Reed
"synchronicity" 2016
 Funny or Die "9 Lives" episode (2010)
 Dewana's Bridal – starring Jaime King and Kick Gurry (2009)
 Electronic Beats – "Soundscapes" (2008)
 Powertape Short – "Oblivions Corner", starring Charles Spano (2009)
 Wake up Call – starring Emile Hirsch (2008)
 God Bless Bloc Party (documentary) (2005)

Commercials
 Bonobos- The Undefinable
 Palacio Del Hierro- xmas campaign 2021 
 Wedgewood- Welcome to Wedgewood 
 ADDAMS Family x Go Rving
 La Mer campaign w/ Ana De Armas
 Estee Lauder- Face/ Off
 Lexus- Style w/ MJ Rodriguez
 Lexus- The Whole Package
 Lexus- Freestyle 
 Old Spice- The Great Journey 
 GUCCI x Farfetch
 Jose Cuervo- This is Rumba
 Smirnoff Christmas campaign w/ Laverne Cox (2019)
 Happy Sock Christmas campaign with Gaten Matarazzo (2019)
 Kinder- Bueno
 HSE 24- Spookily Beautiful
 Tribute- With Character
 Birkenstock- An Ode to Feet
 Lycra X Bandaloop
 Vin Vault- The Heist
 Bonprix- Germany
 Pantene- Miracles
 Lexus campaign starring Minnie Driver 
 House of Fraser Christmas Champaign- Your Rules
 Oreo- Shaquille O'Neal 
 Oreo- Christina Aguilera
 Oreo- Neymar Jr.
 Summoners War- Breaking the Barrier 
 Mercedes Benz- Midnight in Stuttgart
 LILD- Reality 
 Dell- Highly Specialized Henry
 Dell- Dial in Debra
 Dell- Desk Jockey Jerry 
 Happy Socks x SNOOP DOGG- The Art of Inspiration
 Kalenji 
 Paco Rabanne campaign w/ Emily Ratajkowski 
 Smirnoff- Smash
 LA MER- Tokyo
 REBELLE
 F&F- Supermarket Woman
 Gogurt- Win Wheels
 Nissan- Tough love 
 Coke Zero- Heroes
 Orbit- Clean Mouth Clean world
 MERCEDES- CHINA
 Vo5- Heads Up
 Honda Civic- FREEDOM
 Honda Hybrid - Ecosystems
 T- Mobile- Soundscapes
 Dolby - Soundscapes w Jodie smith
 Sephora- China
 Coca Cola- summer
 Honda- Element
 DEX- Local Rhythms
 McDonald’s Flip Flop

Fashion Films
 Mercedes Benz- Midnight in Stuttgart
 SYN·CHRO·NIC·I·TY- (Winner- Best Film - Cinemoi Festival, cffa Winner- Best concept- Australian Fashion Film Festival)
 An Ode to Feet- Birkenstock (2019)
 The New Sovereignty – Rhie 2017
 Welcome to wedgewood-  (2020)
 GUCCI x Farfetch
 Since Last Time- INSIGHT
 The Purgatory of Monotony ( 2016) –(*Best Film, Best Director, and Best Art Direction awards at the Milan Fashion Film Festival*Gold- Best Fashion & Best Production Design. Silver- Best Actress & Best Editing. Bronze for Best Idea at the Berlin Fashion Film Festival Best Creative Concept & Best Actress at the International Fashion Film Festival *Best Actress- Mercdes-Benz Bokeh Fashion Film Festival Best Production Design- Australian International Fashion Film Festival)
 The Bad Boy- Rhie 2014

References

1982 births
Living people
People from Venice, Los Angeles
American filmmakers
USC School of Cinematic Arts alumni
Crossroads School alumni